The 2017 Murray State Racers football team represented Murray State University in the 2017 NCAA Division I FCS football season. They were led by third-year head coach Mitch Stewart and played their home games at Roy Stewart Stadium. They were members of the Ohio Valley Conference. They finished the season 3–8, 2–5 in OVC play to finish in a tie for seventh place.

Schedule

Source: Schedule

References

Murray State
Murray State Racers football seasons
Murray State Racers football